Charles Harvey Stileman (15 February 1863 – 23 February 1925) was an Anglican clergyman, the inaugural Anglican Bishop in Persia from 1912 until 1917.

Charles Harvey Stileman was educated at Repton School and Trinity College, Cambridge. Ordained in 1887, his first post was as a curate at St Peter's North Shields. He subsequently became a missionary in the Middle East. His last post before elevation to the episcopate was as secretary of the Church of England Zenana Mission. On his return to England he was Vicar of Emmanuel Church, Clifton, Bristol. He died on 23 February 1925. His brother, Leonard, was a first-class cricketer.

References

1863 births
1925 deaths
People educated at Repton School
Alumni of Trinity College, Cambridge
Anglican missionaries in Iran
Anglican bishops of the Diocese of Iran
20th-century Anglican bishops in the Middle East
Church of England Zenana Missionary Society
English Anglican missionaries
British expatriates in Iran